2920 Automedon  is a large Jupiter trojan from the Greek camp, approximately  in diameter. It was discovered by American astronomer Edward Bowell at the Anderson Mesa station of the Lowell Observatory on 3 May 1981. The dark D-type asteroid has a rotation period of 10.22 hours and belongs to the 30 largest Jupiter trojans. It was named after the ancient Greek hero Automedon, the charioteer of Achilles.

Orbit and classification 

Automedon is a dark Jovian asteroid orbiting in the leading Greek camp at Jupiter's  Lagrangian point, 60° ahead of its orbit in a 1:1 resonance (see Trojans in astronomy). It is a non-family asteroid in the Jovian background population.

It orbits the Sun at a distance of 5.0–5.2 AU once every 11 years and 6 months (4,217 days; semi-major axis of 5.11 AU). Its orbit has an eccentricity of 0.03 and an inclination of 21° with respect to the ecliptic. The body's observation arc begins with its official discovery observation at Anderson Mesa.

Physical characteristics 

In the SMASS classification, Automedon is a dark D-type asteroid (first SMASS survey, Xu 1995). It is also a generically assumed C-type asteroid.

Rotation period 

Three rotational lightcurves of Automedon have been obtained from photometric observations, that are all in good agreement.

In June 1994, observations by Stefano Mottola using the now decommissioned Bochum 0.61-metre Telescope at ESO's La Silla Observatory in Chile gave a rotation period of 10.220 hours with a brightness variation of 0.12 magnitude.

A second lightcurve gave a period of 10.212 hours with an amplitude of 0.17 magnitude. It was measured in July 2007, by astronomers using telescopes at the Calvin College Observatory  in Michigan and the Calvin-Rehoboth Robotic Observatory in New Mexico. In June 2017, another observation by Brian Warner and Robert Stephens at the Center for Solar System Studies  in California gave a period of 10.223 hours with an amplitude of 0.11 magnitude.

Diameter and albedo 

According to the surveys carried out by the Japanese Akari satellite, the Infrared Astronomical Satellite IRAS, and the NEOWISE mission of NASA's Wide-field Infrared Survey Explorer, Automedon measures between 88.57 and 113.11 kilometers in diameter and its surface has an albedo between 0.042 and 0.068.

The Collaborative Asteroid Lightcurve Link adopts the results obtained by IRAS, that is, an albedo of 0.0433 and a diameter of 111.01 kilometers based on an absolute magnitude of 8.8.

Naming 

This minor planet was named after the Greek mythology hero Automedon, Greek mythology. He was the son of Diorês and the charioteer of Greek hero Achilles during the Trojan War. Automedon took revenge for the death of Patroclus by killing the Trojan Aretus. The official naming citation was published by the Minor Planet Center on 17 February 1984.

Notes

References

External links 
 Asteroid Lightcurve Database (LCDB), query form (info )
 Dictionary of Minor Planet Names, Google books
 Discovery Circumstances: Numbered Minor Planets (1)-(5000) – Minor Planet Center
 
 

002920
Discoveries by Edward L. G. Bowell
Named minor planets
19810503